To be distinguished from Giuditta a German operetta by Franz Lehár.

Note La Giuditta may refer to one of several Italian oratorios, further elaborated below.

Each version of La Giuditta deals with the figure of Judith, from the Biblical Apocrypha, who liberated the besieged city of Bethulia by seducing and then beheading the enemy General Holofernes. Judith and Holofernes are the two main roles common to all versions. Incidental characters, such as, in the larger Scarlatti Giuditta, Achior, a captain so revolted by Holofernes' brutality that he defects to the Israelite army, do not occur in other versions.

Italian language oratorios

Scarlatti's Rome Giuditta
Alessandro Scarlatti: La Giuditta, Rome, 1693. Libretto by Cardinal Pietro Ottoboni.
"Scarlatti considered it his finest oratorio, and its dramatic structure, rapidly interweaving brief scenes in Holofernes's camp with events in the troubled city, is remarkable."
Recordings:
 Giuditta: Mária Zádori, Oloferne: Drew Minter, Achior: Guy de Mey, Capella Savaria dir. Nicholas McGegan. Hungaroton, HCD 12910
 Giuditta: Céline Ricci, Oloferne (countertenor): Martin Oro. Achior (tenor): Vincenzo Di Donato. Parlement de Musique. dir. Martin Gester. Ambronay.

Scarlatti's Cambridge Giuditta
Alessandro Scarlatti: La Giuditta, Rome or Naples 1697, Libretto by Prince Antonio Ottoboni, father of the cardinal. This smaller setting for three voices, strings and basso continuo, is known today as the "Cambridge" Giuditta, since its manuscript is conserved in the Rowe Music Library of King's College, Cambridge.
Recordings:
 Giuditta: Rosita Frisani, Oloferne: Mario Nuvoli, Nutrice: Marco Lazzara. Alessandro Stradella Consort, dir. Estevan Velardi. Bongiovanni 2006
 Giuditta: Julianne Baird, Oloferne: Philip Anderson, Nutrice: Marshall Coid. The Queen's Chamber Band, dir. Elaine Comparone. Albany 2007.
 Giuditta: Sophie Landy, Oloferne: Carl Ghazarossian, Nutrice: Raphaël Pichon. Ensemble Baroque di Nice, dir. Gilbert Bezzina. live 2008.

Almeida's Giuditta
Francisco António de Almeida: La Giuditta
Recording:
 Giuditta: Lena Lootens, Oloferne: Martyn Hill, Achiorre: Francesca Congiu, Ozias: Axel Köhler. Concerto Köln, René Jacobs. Harmonia Mundi.

Metastasio's Giuditta

Metastasio's libretto, printed in some editions as Giuditta, is better known as Betulia liberata ("The Liberation of Bethulia"), K. 118, 1771. The original libretto by Metastasio was for Georg Reutter II (1734), and also set by 30 other composers, including the 15-year-old Mozart.

Other composers
 Marco da Gagliano La Giuditta 1626; three-act opera (lost), libretto Andrea Salvadori, used as the basis for the Judith of Martin Opitz (1635).
 Maurizio Cazzati, Bologna 24 March 1668. Libretto Count Astorre Orsi.
 Antonio Draghi, Vienna 1668
 Marc' Antonio Ziani Vienna 1686
 Antonio Lotti La Giuditta a 3 voci, Vienna 1701
 Carlo Badia, Vienna 1704
 Benedetto Marcello, 1709 to his own libretto
 Carlo Badia (second setting), Vienna 1710
 Giuseppe Porsile, Vienna 1723

Latin oratorios
These oratorios are generally listed under Latin names:
 Vivaldi: Juditha triumphans

References

Oratorios